Lovely Molly is a 2011 American supernatural horror film directed by Eduardo Sánchez. The film initially had a working title of The Possession but was later changed to Lovely Molly. The plot follows newlyweds Molly and Tim as they move into the bride's childhood home, where painful memories and a powerful demon soon begin to haunt Molly.

Plot
The film opens with a video recording of Molly apologizing for her actions and attempting to slit her throat with a knife. The date is October 16, 2011, and much of the film is revealed in flashback.

Tim (Johnny Lewis) and Molly get married and move into Molly's childhood home. Strange happenings in the house soon plague the couple. Tim has to leave town for a few days, leaving Molly, a recovering heroin addict, alone. The film reveals a hidden underground shrine in the shed. In her childhood room, Molly hears crying in her closet. Upon Tim's return, he discovers Molly naked and staring blankly into a corner of the bedroom, appearing delusional.

Molly begins to record their neighbors, a little girl and her mother who live nearby. She encounters paranormal forces in the house and at work, where she hears a man singing the traditional song "Lovely Molly." The next day, Molly's boss shows her the surveillance camera footage, which seems to show Molly being sexually assaulted by an unknown force. Molly becomes hysterical and is sent home. Her condition becomes worse as she films and talks to a dead deer, and attempts to seduce the local pastor. Fearing for her safety, Tim takes her to the doctor, but she is healthy. That night, Molly attacks Tim and bites his lips, nearly pulling them off. Terrified, Tim calls Molly's sister Hannah. In the basement, Hannah finds that Molly has been keeping a rotting deer that she stabs, screaming that their father told her Hannah killed him. Hannah says that she was protecting herself and the young Molly from their father, and asks Molly to come live with her. Molly giggles, saying that if she does, her father will kill Hannah's son Peter.

Molly continues secretly filming the neighbor. As a distraught Tim sits with the young girl's mother on the couch, it is clear they are familiar, and she performs oral sex on him. Pastor Bobby visits Molly, who emerges naked, and the two embrace. Shortly afterward, Pastor Bobby is seen in the bathtub, dead and covered in bites. Tim goes home and finds the video camera playing, showing a recording of himself with the neighbour. Molly strikes him and kills him by stabbing him in the head with a screwdriver, the same way Pastor Bobby was killed. The police are later seen in the woods digging to reveal the body of the young girl as the mother sobs. Molly leaves the site and lies naked and sobbing on the floor until her attitude abruptly changes and she smiles. She walks out naked toward a tall figure with glowing eyes, a horse head, and the body of a man (resembling the demon Orobas).

In the aftermath, the couple's house is up for sale. Time has passed with no answer as to Molly's whereabouts or her disappearance. In their old bedroom, Hannah finds the family photo album on the floor. In it, she sees that their father's face has been covered with horse heads from his frame collection. Hearing a noise from the closet, she opens it and in a trance-like state reaches towards something unseen, similar to Molly's discovery earlier.

Cast
Gretchen Lodge as Molly
Johnny Lewis as Tim
Alexandra Holden as Hannah
Ken Arnold as Samuels
Field Blauvelt: Pastor Bobby 
Kevin Murray: Hensley
Daniel Ross: Victor
Lauren Lakis as Lauren

Production

Filming for Lovely Molly began in late 2010 in Hagerstown, Maryland, with Dahlgren Chapel being one of the locations filmed.

Soundtrack
The score for Lovely Molly was composed by the Chicago-based post-rock band Tortoise, and recorded at John McEntire's Soma Electronic Music Studios. The title track "Lovely Molly" is an arrangement of the folk song "Courting is a Pleasure" (Roud 454), a traditional emigration ballad that has been recorded by artists such as The Stanley Brothers (in 1961), Norma Waterson (in 1977), and Nic Jones (in 1980). The film also contains the song "Wish I May", by the American heavy metal band Breaking Benjamin.

Reception

Critical reception for Lovely Molly was mixed, with the film holding a 44% "rotten" rating on Rotten Tomatoes based on 39 ratings.

Lovely Molly received positive reviews from The New York Times and the A.V. Club, with the latter praising Gretchen Lodge's performance and favorably comparing the film to Roman Polanski's Repulsion (1965). Little White Lies also praised both Lodge's "transformative performance" and Sánchez's "challengingly ambiguous" tone, while Toronto.com wrote that "there’s just enough of the right stuff in Lovely Molly – a pervasive sense of dread, an implacably evil presence and a doomed heroine – to leave a haunting and lasting impression."

The Globe and Mail panned the film, writing that "Some of the shock effects in Lovely Molly are successfully disorienting, but too many of its ideas are reductive and histrionic." The Newark Star-Ledger also criticized the film, claiming that it represented "stuff we’ve seen before." The Guardian gave the film two stars, stating that "the film presents us with too many unearned revelations, and it unravels."

References

External links

2012 films
2012 horror films
American supernatural horror films
Films about infidelity
Films about murderers
Films about sisters
Films set in 2011
Films shot in Maryland
Films directed by Eduardo Sánchez (director)
Mariticide in fiction
Films with screenplays by Eduardo Sánchez (director)
Films produced by Gregg Hale (producer)
Haxan Films films
2010s English-language films
2010s American films